William Neville (by 1532–1559 or later) was an English politician.

He was a Member (MP) of the Parliament of England for Chippenham in 1558.

References

16th-century births
Year of death missing
English MPs 1558
People from Chippenham
16th-century deaths